Rocco is a 2016 French documentary film, co-directed by Thierry Demaizière and Alban Teurlai.

Synopsis
A dive into the pornographic film industry through the eyes of Italian pornographic actor, producer, and director Rocco Siffredi.

Cast
 Rocco Siffredi as himself
 Rosa Caracciolo as herself
 Abella Danger as herself
 James Deen as himself
 Gabriele Galetta as himself
 Mark Spiegler as himself
 Kelly Stafford as herself

Reception
Boyd van Hoeij from The Hollywood Reporter, called it a "fascinating and beautifully crafted work that tries to paint a nuanced picture of the man himself and, to an extent, the industry in which he worked" E. Nina Rothe from The Huffington Post, wrote: "From its opening shot, it’s clear that Rocco is not a film for the faint of heart. It is raw, hard-core, violent and savage. And yet, hidden beneath this world of porn and Rocco Siffredi — the film’s anti-hero with a Faustian secret — lies a message about how empowered we each are, when it comes to our own sexuality."

Rocco won the NIN Award at the FEST International Film Festival.

References

External links
 
 

2016 documentary films
French documentary films
Documentary films about pornography
2010s French films